Harmanlı is a village in the district of Arsin, Trabzon Province, Turkey. It is located 28 kilometers from Trabzon, 8 kilometers from Arsin, and 8-9 kilometers from Yomra.

The early name of Harmanlı was Varvara. This name is an Anatolian version of the name of Barbara (a female name). It is thought to have been an Ottoman Greek village before the establishment of the Republic of Turkey. However, there is no evidence except its name in favor of this claim.

Population and economy 
The population is approximately 1,000.

The economy is mostly based on agriculture. The main product is hazelnuts and the income level is insufficient to survive. It is because of this that many people have emigrated from the village for economic opportunities.

Roads 
One can go to this village by following a road starting a point between Yomra and Arsin and rising up to the mountains, approximately 5 kilometers.

Villages in Trabzon Province